Uroplatus alluaudi, also known commonly as the northern flat-tail gecko and the northern leaf-tail gecko, is a species of lizard in the family Gekkonidae. The species is endemic to Madagascar.

Etymology
The specific name, alluaudi, is in honor of French entomologist Charles Alluad.

Geographic range
U. alluaudi is found in northern Madagascar.

Habitat

Reproduction
U. alluaudi is oviparous.

References

Further reading
Andreone F, Aprea G (2006). "A new finding of Uroplatus alluaudi in north-eastern Madagascar widens considerably its distribution range (Reptilia, Gekkonidae)". Acta Herpetologica 1 (2): 121–125.
Glaw F, Vences M (2006). A Field Guide to the Amphibians and Reptiles of Madagascar, Third Edition. Cologne, Germany: Vences & Glaw Velag. 496 pp. .
Mocquard F (1894). "Diagnoses de quelques reptiles nouveaux de Madagascar ". Compte-Rendu des Séances de la Société Philomathique de Paris 9:  3–5. (Uroplatus alluaudi, new species, p. 3). (in French).

Uroplatus
Geckos of Africa
Endemic fauna of Madagascar
Reptiles of Madagascar
Reptiles described in 1894
Taxa named by François Mocquard